The List of Hawker Tempest operators lists the counties and their air force units that have operated the aircraft:

Operators

Canada
Royal Canadian Air Force
Only one Hawker Tempest was ever operated by the RCAF. The aircraft was in service from 1946 to 1947.

Nazi Germany
One Mk.5 (EJ709) was salvaged by 2./Versuchsverband O.K.L. after getting shot down in October 1944 and ferried to Finow for repairs. It was repaired with parts of another Tempest which was shot down at Thiene near Hesepe on 29 December 1944.

India
Indian Air Force

No. 1 Squadron, Indian Air Force
No. 3 Squadron, Indian Air Force
No. 4 Squadron, Indian Air Force
No. 7 Squadron, Indian Air Force
No. 8 Squadron, Indian Air Force
No. 9 Squadron, Indian Air Force
No. 10 Squadron, Indian Air Force

New Zealand

Royal New Zealand Air Force
No. 486 Squadron RNZAF

Pakistan 
Royal Pakistan Air Force
 No. 5 Squadron Falcons
 No. 9 Squadron Griffins
No. 14 Squadron Tail Choppers

Inherited 16 Tempest Mk.IIs from the British Indian Air Force instead of the original 35 fighters in 1947.

United Kingdom
Royal Air Force
No. 3 Squadron RAF
No. 5 Squadron RAF
No. 6 Squadron RAF
No. 8 Squadron RAF
No. 16 Squadron RAF
No. 20 Squadron RAF
No. 23 Squadron RAF
No. 26 Squadron RAF
No. 30 Squadron RAF
No. 33 Squadron RAF
No. 39 Squadron RAF
No. 54 Squadron RAF
No. 56 Squadron RAF
No. 80 Squadron RAF
No. 152 Squadron RAF
No. 174 Squadron RAF
No. 181 Squadron RAF
No. 182 Squadron RAF
No. 183 Squadron RAF
No. 213 Squadron RAF
No. 222 Squadron RAF
No. 247 Squadron RAF
No. 249 Squadron RAF
No. 266 Squadron RAF
No. 274 Squadron RAF
No. 287 Squadron RAF
No. 349 Squadron RAF
No. 501 Squadron RAF

See also
Hawker Tempest

References

Hawker Tempest
Tempest
Hawker aircraft